Verkhnyaya Lobanova is a rural locality (a village) in Ust-Zulinskoye Rural Settlement, Yurlinsky District, Perm Krai, Russia. The population was 67 as of 2010. There are 3 streets.

Geography 
Verkhnyaya Lobanova is located 12 km northeast of Yurla (the district's administrative centre) by road. Mironova is the nearest rural locality.

References 

Rural localities in Yurlinsky District